The 2014–15 TCU Horned Frogs basketball team represented Texas Christian University in the 2014–15 NCAA Division I men's basketball season. This was head coach Trent Johnson's third season at TCU. They were members of the Big 12 Conference. Due to construction on Daniel–Meyer Coliseum, which has been the Horned Frogs' home arena since 1961–62, TCU played all of their home games at Fort Worth Independent School District's Wilkerson-Greines Activity Center for the 2014–15 season.

Previous season
The 2013–14 Horned Frogs finished the season 9–22, 0–18 in Big 12 play to finish in last place. They lost in the first round of the Big 12 tournament to Baylor. They are looking to win their first conference game since March 19, 2013, two seasons ago.

Departures

Incoming transfers

Recruits

Roster

Schedule 

|-
!colspan=9 style="background:#520063; color:#FFFFFF;"| Exhibition

|-
!colspan=9 style="background:#520063; color:#FFFFFF;"| Non-conference games

|-
!colspan=9 style="background:#520063; color:#FFFFFF;"| Conference games

|-
!colspan=9 style="background:#520063; color:#FFFFFF;"| Big 12 tournament

Rankings

See also
2014–15 TCU Horned Frogs women's basketball team

References 

Tcu
TCU Horned Frogs men's basketball seasons